The 2013 Towson Tigers football team represented Towson University in the 2013 NCAA Division I FCS football season. They were led by fifth-year head coach Rob Ambrose and played their home games at Johnny Unitas Stadium. They were a member of the Colonial Athletic Association. They finished the season 13–3, 6–2 in CAA play to finish in a tie for second place. The season included the program's first win over a Football Bowl Subdivision opponent, UConn. The Tigers received an at-large bid to the FCS Playoffs, where they defeated Fordham, Eastern Illinois, and Eastern Washington to advance to the FCS National Championship game, where they lost to North Dakota State.

NFL draftee Terrance West  ran for an NCAA season record 2509 yards.

Schedule
Towson played a 12-game regular season schedule for only the fourth time in school history during the 2013 season.

Ranking movements

References

Towson
Towson Tigers football seasons
Towson
Towson Tigers football